Muamer Abdulrab (20 August 1982 – 14 December 2021) was a Qatari footballer who played as a defender for Qatar in the 2004 Asian Cup. He also played for Qatar SC, Al-Sailiya SC, Al Kharaitiyat SC. Abdulrab died on 14 December 2021, at the age of 39.

References

External links
 
 11v11 Profile

1982 births
2021 deaths
Qatari footballers
Association football defenders
Qatar international footballers
Footballers at the 2002 Asian Games
Asian Games competitors for Qatar
Qatar SC players
Al-Sailiya SC players
Al Kharaitiyat SC players
Qatar Stars League players